Following is a list of senators of Val-d'Oise, people who have represented the department of Val-d'Oise in the Senate of France.
The department was created in 1968 during a reorganization of the former Seine and Seine-et-Oise departments.

Fifth Republic 
Senators for Val-d'Oise under the French Fifth Republic were:

References

Sources

 
Val-d'Oise